The XVI Venice Challenge Save Cup was a professional tennis tournament played on clay courts. It was the 5th edition of the men's tournament which was part of the 2018 ATP Challenger Tour. It took place in Mestre, Italy between 21 and 27 May 2018.

Singles main-draw entrants

Seeds

1 Rankings as of 14 May 2018.

Other entrants
The following players received wildcards into the singles main draw:
  Andrea Arnaboldi
  Filippo Baldi
  Liam Caruana
  Gian Marco Moroni

The following players received entry into the singles main draw as special exempts:
  Luca Vanni
  Mario Vilella Martínez

The following players received entry from the qualifying draw:
  Edoardo Eremin
  Federico Gaio
  Roberto Marcora
  Daniel Masur

Champions

Singles

 Gianluigi Quinzi def.  Gian Marco Moroni 6–2, 6–2.

Doubles

 Marin Draganja /  Tomislav Draganja def.  Romain Arneodo /  Danilo Petrović 6–4, 6–7(2–7), [10–2].

References

Venice Challenge Save Cup
2018
May 2018 sports events in Italy
2018 in Italian sport